The Townswomen's Guild (TG) is a British women's organisation. There are approximately 30,000 members, 706 branches and 77 Federations throughout England, Scotland, Wales and Northern Ireland, the Isle of Man and the Isle of Wight. (Figures updated 1 August 2013).

The Townswomen's Guild is the second largest British women's organisation. It consists of local branches, known as guilds, and federations, which are groups of local guilds who work together throughout the UK.

The movement was formed in 1929, at the instigation of Margery Corbett Ashby and Eva Hubback, when all women over 21 won the right to vote and with the aim of educating women about good citizenship.

Membership and organisational Structure 

The national headquarters of the Townswomen's Guilds (TG), is in Birmingham, England.

Hierarchy 

The Townswomen's Guilds' (TG) Patron is Her Royal Highness The Princess Royal, and the organisation's National President is Dame Diana Brittan DBE. Its National Vice-Presidents are Dame Jocelyn Barrow DBE, Eileen Bell CBE and Baroness Flather.

The Guilds' Honorary Life National Vice-Presidents are Maggie Chilton MBE, Jean Ellerton JP, Marjory Hall OBE, Jean Hunt, Pamela Pollock, Pauline Myers, Sue Smith OBE, Iris Shanahan MBE, Pauline Myers and Margaret Key.

The current National Chairman is Penny Ryan, who leads the board of the National Executive Committee (NEC) in the running the organisation and the staff at the headquarters.

Awards 
Every year, members are recognised and awards are presented at the organisation’s Annual General Meeting (AGM). "Townswoman of the Year" is an award presented to a member who has devoted their time and energy to the organisation and is chosen by the National Chairman. The "Officers’ Trophy" is given to a member who has exceptionally gone ‘above and beyond the call of duty’ to support an organisation or charity and is chosen by the National Executive Committee (NEC).

Townswoman 

The Townswomen’s Guilds (TG) produces Townswoman, a magazine for its members which is published quarterly every year - it is delivered directly to all TG members. Townswoman contains a mixture of articles covering all aspects of the organisation and more general features of interest to the members.

Activities 
Guilds meet mainly monthly, and their programmes include speakers, demonstrations, social activities and outings. Townswomen also get involved in charitable events, International Women's Day, sports, creative leisure activities, competitions and exhibitions. The Guild tries to influence change, with a focus on public affairs, using the opinions of its members on important issues for the attention of decision-makers.

History 
In 1897, the National Union of Women's Suffrage Societies was formed and it was led by suffragist Millicent Fawcett and in 1918 some women in Britain got the vote. At this point the National Union of Societies for Equal Citizenship became the new name of the suffragist organisation.

In 1928, all women over the age of 21 were given the vote as a result of the Equal Franchise Act irrespective of their property, education or previous interests. The following year the idea of urban Guilds was launched by Margery Corbett Ashby, for women to meet and learn about citizenship and how to use the vote. The idea was to be based on the successful Women's Institutes, but the new guild was designed to appeal to urban women. The first Guild was opened in Hayward's Heath. Guilds were able to meet and help others locally by forming Federations.

In 1932, the organisation had 146 guilds and it became the National Union of Townswomen's Guilds and Gertrude Horton became its National Secretary. Alice Franklin became the honorary (ie. unpaid) secretary in 1933. The two of them had published a national handbook from the central offices in Cromwell Place in London in 1938. The handbook included regulations and advice on finance and democracy and how to organise a meeting. By 1939 there were 544 guilds established with 54,000 members. 

During the Second World War, the central organisation was reduced to just Franklin and Horton. They would shelter from bombing in the cellar, and one night in April 1941, Horton lost four members of her family to a bomb in Hampstead. During the war years, the Government asked the NUTG to encourage War married women who were not eligible for National Service to work locally to release others for war work.

1948 saw reorganisation when Mary Courtney, a new national secretary, was elected. Alice Franklin resigned after a dispute, and Horton was forced out the following year. In the early 1950s, the Guild had over 130,000 members.

Campaigns
Guilds and Federations took the opportunity to join in the Festival of Britain celebrations in 1951, and continued to campaign on national affairs.

In the 1960s, 1970s and 1980s, members campaigned on issues such as environmental pollution, mixed-sex wards, nuclear power, food additives, prescription charges and carers' rights.

The National Union of Townswomen's Guilds became Townswomen's Guilds in 1989. The following year, nearly £200,000 was raised to plant trees in six new woods, to help the environment and to replace trees lost in storms in the late 1980s. In the 1990s, members continued campaigning on single person supplements, medicinal cannabis and genetic screening.

In the 2000s, members campaigned on post office closures, parental accountability and human trafficking. The 2010s saw campaigns on empty homes, geriatric care in hospitals, gambling advertising, getting rid of cheques, banning FGM and modern slavery.

In 2014, a new logo was introduced. A TG memorial was commissioned in 2017 for the National Memorial Arboretum.

References

Other sources
Stott, Mary; Organization woman : the story of the National Union of Townswomen's  Guilds, Heineman, 1978

External links
 Guild website
 Gloucestershire Federation of Townswomens Guilds

Clubs and societies in the United Kingdom
Women's organisations based in the United Kingdom